Two ships of the Royal Navy have been named HMS Guerriere, French for "warrior".

The first HMS Guerriere was a 74-gun third-rate ship of the line, originally the French ship Peuple Souverain, captured on 2 July 1798 at the Battle of the Nile. She was used as a sheer hulk from 1800 and broken up in 1810.
The second  was a 38-gun fifth-rate frigate, originally French, captured in 1806 by HMS Blanche off the Faroe Islands. In the War of 1812 she was captured by the American frigate  after a battle on 19 August 1812 and burned.

See also

References

Royal Navy ship names